Melara is a comune (municipality) in the Province of Rovigo in the Italian region Veneto, located about  southwest of Venice and about  west of Rovigo.

The municipality of Melara contains the frazione (subdivision) Santo Stefano.

Melara borders the following municipalities: Bergantino, Borgofranco sul Po, Cerea, Ostiglia.

Demography 
Below is a graph showing the decennial change in population of Melara from 1871 to 2001.

References

External links
 www.comune.melara.ro.it

Cities and towns in Veneto